Kuran (also Romanized as Kūran; also known as Kahrān) is a village in Chahardangeh-ye Jonubi Rural District of Chahardangeh District, Hurand County, East Azerbaijan province, Iran. At the 2006 National Census, its population was 524 in 114 households, when it was in the former Hurand District of Ahar County. The following census in 2011 counted 506 people in 147 households. The latest census in 2016 showed a population of 403 people in 135 households; it is the center of its rural district.

References 

Populated places in East Azerbaijan Province